Anomala dimidiata is a species of scarab beetle. It is a pest of millets.

References

Rutelinae
Insect pests of millets